The 2019 Seattle Redhawks men's soccer team represented Seattle University during the 2019 NCAA Division I men's soccer season and the 2019 Western Athletic Conference men's soccer season. The regular season began on August 30 and concluded on November 9. It was the program's 53rd season fielding a men's varsity soccer team, and their 8th season in the Western Athletic Conference. The 2019 season was Pete Fewing's eighth year as head coach for the program.

Roster

Schedule 

Source:

|-
!colspan=6 style=""| Non-conference regular season
|-

|-
!colspan=6 style=""| Western Athletic Conference regular season
|-

|-
!colspan=6 style=""| WAC Tournament
|-

|-
!colspan=6 style=""| NCAA Tournament
|-

References 

2019
Seattle Redhawks
Seattle Redhawks
Seattle Redhawks men's soccer
Seattle Redhawks